The 2019–20 Reading F.C. Women season was the club's 13th season and their fourth in the FA Women's Super League, the highest level of the football pyramid. Along with competing in the WSL, the club also contested two domestic cup competitions: the FA Cup and the League Cup.

On 13 March 2020, in line with the FA's response to the coronavirus pandemic, it was announced the season was temporarily suspended until at least 3 April 2020. After further postponements, the season was ultimately ended prematurely on 25 May 2020 with immediate effect. Reading sat in 5th at the time, overtaken by Manchester United in the final gameweek prior to the cancellation having had their fixture postponed because of Arsenal's participation in the FA Cup. They retained 5th position on sporting merit after The FA Board's decision to award places on a points-per-game basis.

Season events
On 13 January, Fara Williams extended her contract with Reading until the end of the 2020-21 season.

On 15 February, Brooke Chaplen extended her contract with Reading until the end of the 2020-21 season.

Transfers

In

Out

Loans out

Released

Squad

Out on loan

Friendlies

Competitions

WSL

Results summary

Results by matchday

Results

Table

FA Cup

As a member of the top two tiers, Reading entered the FA Cup in the fourth round.

League Cup

Group stage

Knockout phase

Squad statistics

Appearances 

|-
|colspan="14"|Players away from the club on loan:

|-
|colspan="14"|Players who appeared for Reading but left during the season:

|}

Goal scorers

Clean sheets

Disciplinary record

References 

Reading